This is a list of by-elections to the 11th Jatiya Sangsad (Bangladesh Parliament);

2019

2020

2021

2022

2023

References 

Jatiya Sangsad
Elections in Bangladesh